Ericeia epitheca is a moth in the family Erebidae first described by Charles Swinhoe in 1915. It is found on New Guinea, where it has been recorded from Fergusson Island.

References

Moths described in 1915
Ericeia